Dagli Appennini alle Ande is a 1943 Italian drama film directed by Flavio Calzavara, starring Cesare Barbetti, Leda Gloria, Nino Pavese, Margherita Del Plata and Cesco Baseggio. It tells the story of the young boy Marco who secretly embarks from Genoa to reach his mother in Argentina. The film is based on the story with the same title from Edmondo De Amicis's book Heart. The story has been adapted for film multiple times both before and after.

The film was released in Italian cinemas on 12 February 1943.

Cast
 Cesare Barbetti as Marco Ansaldi
 Leda Gloria as Maria Ansaldi, sua madre
 Nino Pavese as Pegna
 Cesco Baseggio as Il vecchio matto
 Margherita Del Plata as La ballerina
 Nino Marchesini as Il comandante della nave
 Carlo Monteaux as Il signor Van Leiss
 Gina Cinquini as La signora Van Leiss
 Vira Silenti as La bambina
 Mario Siletti as Bendano, un contadino
 Pietro Tordi as Ulano, un contadino
 Giulio Battiferri as Sultano, un contadino

References

1943 drama films
1943 films
Films based on Italian novels
Films based on works by Edmondo De Amicis
Films directed by Flavio Calzavara
Italian drama films
1940s Italian-language films
Italian black-and-white films
Works based on Heart (novel)
1940s Italian films